The Department of Treasury and Finance (DTF), often informally referred to as the Treasury, is a government department in Victoria, Australia.

One of Victoria's oldest public institutions, the Treasury has existed in various forms throughout Victorian history. It is currently responsible for the state's economic and fiscal policy, taxation and delivery of the budget.

History

The Department of Treasury and Finance can trace its origins to the earliest days of the settlement that became the State of Victoria. The department is one of Victoria’s oldest institutions, predating the Parliament of Victoria by more than a decade.

As well as being involved in collecting revenue from land sales and customs duty, the treasury became the principal agency responsible for the sale and safe storage of gold extracted from Victoria’s mines in the second half of the nineteenth century (see Victorian Gold Rush).

The building of the treasury (now known as 'the old treasury building'), along with other civic offices like the Parliament, Customs House, and Post Office, was a reaction by authorities who wanted to display state power in Melbourne because of fears of public disorder following the gold rush.

Buildings

The Department of Treasury and Finance performs its operations in two main buildings:

 1 Treasury Place
 1 Macarthur Street

Barry Patten designed 1 Treasury Place and built it in the 1960s according to the Internationalist style of architecture. The building is also on the Victorian Heritage Register. Since a skyway connects 1 Treasury Place to 1 Macarthur Street, both are often considered to be part of the same building. The whole area linking Parliament House, St. Patrick's Cathedral, Fitzroy Gardens, and Treasury Gardens is called the Treasury Reserve, a heritage-listed precinct.

Before 1878, the Victorian Treasury was situated at the corner of Spring Street and Macarthur Street. When the state treasurer and his officers moved to Treasury Place, the old building was renamed the Old Treasury. Old Treasury was widely regarded as the finest 19th century public building in Australia. Upstairs in the building, Treasury officials kept the colony’s accounts. Below, in the basement, were bluestone vaults for storing the gold sent by government escort from the goldmining fields.

Ministers
, the DTF supports two ministers in the following portfolio areas:

Functions
The DTF has responsibility for the following policy areas:
 Economic policy
 Fiscal policy
 Revenue policy, including stamp duty, payroll tax and land tax
 Appropriations and budget delivery
 State borrowing, investment and financial arrangements
 Financial reporting and accountability

Notes

Treasury
State government finances in Australia